Asuridia yuennanica is a moth of the family Erebidae. It is found in China (Yunnan).

References

Nudariina
Moths described in 1951